Amphipteryx agrioides, the montane relict damsel, is a species of damselfly in family Amphipterygidae. It is found in Guatemala, Honduras, Mexico, and possibly Colombia. Its natural habitats are subtropical or tropical moist montane forests and rivers. It is threatened by habitat loss through deforestation for coffee plantations and cattle ranching.

Sources

Calopterygoidea
Insects described in 1853
Taxonomy articles created by Polbot